This is a complete list of members of the Parliament of Malaysia based on seniority .

Seniority 
Seniority of members are determined by the Yang di-Pertuan Agong. But based on common practice, members are ranked by the number of consecutive terms as either Senator or Member of the House and seniority date (i.e. date of first swearing in as either Senator of Member of the House). Senators and Members of the House who swear in on the same day are later ordered numerically according to the Hansard.

Vacancies

Senate 

 21 December 2022 — 19 vacancies occurred on the opening of the present Parliament.

House of Representatives

Current seniority list 
Note that the italicised name of constituency represents that of the Senate.

See also 

 Malaysian order of precedence

Footnotes

References 

Parliament of Malaysia